Donald “Dee” Ford (born March 19, 1991) is an American football defensive end who is a free agent. He was drafted by the Kansas City Chiefs in the first round of the 2014 NFL Draft. He played college football at Auburn.

Early years
Ford attended St. Clair County High School in Odenville, Alabama. While there, he played high school football. As a senior, Ford recorded 90 tackles, including 38 tackles for loss and 18 sacks, intercepted a pass, and broke up three while being named to the Class 4A All-State team by the Alabama Sports Writers Association. As a junior, he posted 87 total tackles with 16 tackles for a loss and 12 sacks.

Considered a three-star recruit by Rivals.com, he was ranked as the 62nd best outside linebacker prospect in the nation.

College career
Ford attended Auburn University from 2009 to 2013. During his career, he had 19.5 sacks. As a senior in 2013, he was an All-SEC selection.

College statistics

Professional career

NFL Draft
On January 25, 2014, Ford attended the Reese's Senior Bowl and had an impressive performance after recording two combined tackles, two tackles for a loss, a pass deflection, and sacked Virginia Tech's Logan Thomas twice to help the South defeat the North 20-10. His Senior Bowl performance helped him raise his draft stock. NFL draft experts and analysts projected Ford to be a first or second round. He received an invitation to the NFL combine, but did not perform any physical drills after doctors recommended him sit out after issues stemming from a back injury he suffered in 2011. On March 4, 2014, Ford participated at Auburn's pro day and was able to complete all of the combine and positional drills for team representatives and scouts. All 32 NFL teams had representatives present at Auburn's pro day to scout Ford, Greg Robinson, and ten other prospects. He was ranked the second best defensive end prospect in the draft by NFLDraftScout.com and Sports Illustrated and was ranked the third best defensive end by NFL analyst Mike Mayock.

Kansas City Chiefs
The Kansas City Chiefs selected Ford in the first round (23rd overall) of the 2014 NFL Draft.

2014: Rookie year
Ford competed with Dezman Moses, Frank Zombo, and Josh Mauga throughout training camp for a job as the backup linebacker. Head coach Andy Reid named him the backup right outside linebacker to Tamba Hali to begin the regular season.

Ford made his NFL debut during the 10–26 season-opening loss to the Tennessee Titans. Two weeks later, he recorded his first NFL tackle and deflected a pass during a 34–15 victory over the Miami Dolphins. During Week 8, Ford made a season-high three combined tackles and was credited a half a sack making it the first of his career during a 34–7 victory over the St. Louis Rams. Ford joined a highly-touted linebacking corps as a rookie, that consisted of Justin Houston, Derrick Johnson, and Tamba Hali. With Houston and Hali already staples in the defense, Ford received no starts in 16 game appearances and was limited to only seven combined tackles and 1.5 sacks.

2015 season
Ford returned to his role as the backup outside linebacker in 2015, behind key veteran Hali and Houston. Ford missed Weeks 11-12 after suffering a back injury. During Week 13, Ford earned his first NFL start against the Oakland Raiders after Justin Houston suffered a knee injury that caused him to miss the rest of the season. Ford finished the 34–20 victory over the Raiders with a solo tackle. In the next game against the San Diego Chargers, he made a season-high seven solo tackles, defended a pass, and sacked quarterback Philip Rivers thrice in a 10–3 victory. Ford made his first career solo sack and marked a career-high with his three-sack performance.

Ford finished his second professional season with 23 combined tackles (21 solo), two pass deflections, and four sacks in 14 games and five starts.

2016 season
Ford began the 2016 season as the starting right outside linebacker, in place of Justin Houston, who was recovering from surgery in February to repair a torn ACL.

Ford started in the season-opener against the San Diego Chargers and recorded four solo tackles and a sack on Philip Rivers during the 33-27 overtime victory. During Week 6, Ford made five combined tackles and sacked Oakland Raiders quarterback Derek Carr twice in a 26-10 road victory. He did not record a sack in the next game against the New Orleans Saints and only recorded one tackle total on a down effort/ However, the Chiefs still won 27-21. The following week against the Indianapolis Colts, Ford collected five combined tackles and was credited with a career-high 3.5 sacks on quarterback Andrew Luck during a 30-14 victory. During Week 9, he had his second consecutive game with multiple sacks after he sacked quarterback Blake Bortles twice during a 19-14 victory over the Jacksonville Jaguars. In the next game, Ford collected three combined tackles, deflected a pass, and recorded a sack on Cam Newton, as the Chiefs defeated the Carolina Panthers by a score 20-17. This was his third consecutive game with a sack. Through Ford's first nine games of his 2016 season, he was tied with Lorenzo Alexander as the NFL's sack leader. Although Houston returned to his starting left outside linebacker role in Week 11, Ford was able to start at right outside linebacker from Weeks 14-16 ahead of Tamba Hali.

Ford finished his third season with 38 combined tackles (25 solo), a career-high ten sacks, and two pass deflections in 15 games and 14 starts.

2017 season
On May 1, 2017, the Chiefs exercised the fifth-year option on Ford's rookie contract that pays him $8.71 million in 2018.

Ford was set to begin his fourth season as the backup left outside linebacker to Tamba Hali, until Hali was placed on the Physically Unable to Perform list with an unspecified injury and was set to miss the first six games.

Ford started in the season-opener against the New England Patriots and made four solo tackles in the 42-27 road victory. The following week, he earned two solo tackles and sacked quarterback Carson Wentz in a 27-20 victory over the Philadelphia Eagles. Ford was unable to play in Weeks 4-5 after sustaining a back injury. On October 15, 2017, he collected four combined tackles and a sack on Ben Roethlisberger, as the Chiefs were defeated by the Pittsburgh Steelers by a score 13-19. Ford was placed on injured reserve on December 7, 2017.

2018 season
During Week 8, Ford sacked Case Keenum thrice in a 30-23 win over the Denver Broncos, earning him AFC Defensive Player of the Week. Overall for the month of October, Ford recorded 13 tackles, four sacks, and three forced fumbles, earning himself AFC Defensive Player of the Month.

In the final minutes of the 4th quarter of the 2018 AFC Championship Game against the New England Patriots, Ford was called for an offsides penalty  that reversed a Charvarius Ward interception that would have likely sealed the game for the Chiefs.

On March 2, 2019, the Chiefs placed the franchise tag on Ford.

San Francisco 49ers
On March 12, 2019 the Chiefs agreed to a trade that would send Ford to the San Francisco 49ers in exchange for a second-round pick in the 2020 NFL Draft. Ford would sign a five year contract worth $87.5 million after the trade was officially completed on March 13, 2019.

2019 season

Ford made his 49ers debut in the season-opener against the Tampa Bay Buccaneers, sacking Jameis Winston once in the 31–17 road victory. During Week 6 against the Los Angeles Rams, Ford sacked Jared Goff 1.5 times in the 20–7 road victory.

Ford finished his first season with the 49ers tallying 14 tackles and 6.5 sacks in 11 games and two starts. In the playoffs, he helped the 49ers defeat the Minnesota Vikings and Green Bay Packers to advance to Super Bowl LIV where they would lose to Ford’s former team, the Kansas City Chiefs. Ford recorded two tackles in the Super Bowl.

2020 season
On October 3, 2020, Ford was placed on injured reserve with a neck and back injury. He only played in one game on the season.

2021 season
On November 6, 2021, Ford was placed on injured reserve. He was released on July 27, 2022.

NFL career statistics

Regular season

Postseason

Personal life
Ford is one of three children, born to his parents James and Debbie Ford. His parents married as teenagers, and have been together for three decades. He has a brother and a sister. Debbie worked two jobs, both as a licensed practical nurse, in order to pay the bills when the children were younger.

In addition to playing football, Ford is known for his exceptional piano playing abilities.

References

External links
Kansas City Chiefs bio
Auburn Tigers bio

1991 births
Living people
People from St. Clair County, Alabama
Players of American football from Alabama
American football defensive ends
American football linebackers
Auburn Tigers football players
Kansas City Chiefs players
San Francisco 49ers players
American Conference Pro Bowl players
Ed Block Courage Award recipients